The EN 54 Fire detection and fire alarm systems is a series of European standards that includes product standards and application guidelines for fire detection and fire alarm systems as well as voice alarm systems.

The product standards define product characteristics, test methods and performance criteria against which the effectiveness and reliability of every component of fire detection and fire alarm system can be assessed and declared.

Many of the product standards of the EN 54 series are harmonised standards under the Construction Products Regulation (CPR) EU 305/2011. Annex ZA of the harmonised standards specifies which sections of the standard apply for the purposes of the CPR. Annex ZA also describes the two-stage certification:

 certification of constancy of performance for the product (product certification) and
 certification of conformity of factory production control (FPC certification) 

This standard series is partly used around the world in several countries outside of European Union, for example in Latin American countries, Brasil, African and Asian countries and several islands in the Pacific Ocean.

History 
The standardization topics relating to fire protection were among the first dealt with by CEN. This is obvious since CEN numbers the European standards in numerical ascending order according to the date of project registration. The standard on fire classes is numbered EN 2 and the series of standards on portable fire extinguishers is numbered EN 3. The European standardization on fire detection and fire alarm systems started already in the 1970s. EN 54-1 and EN 54-5 were issued in 1976.

Technical Committee CEN/TC72 Fire detection and fire alarm systems 
The EN 54 series has been prepared by Technical Committee CEN/TC72 "Fire detection and fire alarm systems" of the European Committee for Standardization (CEN, French: Comité Européen de Normalisation).
The figure shows some examples of national mirror technical committees.

EN 54 Standard Series

Current parts 
The EN 54 series of standards covers the following topics and product groups related to fire detection and fire alarm systems:

 Introduction: the introduction to the series of standards contains a diagram of a fire alarm system as well as numerous definitions of terms that are used in the other parts of the series of standards.
 Product group control panels and power supply: These parts of EN 54 concern fire alarm control panels, voice alarm control panels and power supplies.
 Product group alarm devices: These parts of EN 54 concern optical and acoustic alarm devices (flashing lights, sounders, loudspeakers).
 Product group detectors: These parts of EN 54 concern manual call points and automatic fire detectors according to different measuring principles (smoke detectors, heat detectors, fire gas detectors ...).
 Product group "other components": These parts of EN 54 concern other devices that can be connected in a fire detection system, either as a stand-alone device or integrated in another component.
 System compatibility: This part of EN 54 deals with the compatibility of the system components of a fire detection and fire alarm system.
 Application guidelines: These parts of EN 54 are guidelines for the application of fire alarm systems and voice alarm systems. They have the status of a technical specification (CEN/TS).

The following table lists all parts of the EN 54 series of standards:

Withdrawn parts 

 EN 54 part 6	Heat detectors; Rate-of-Rise point detectors without a static element
 EN 54 part 8	Components of automatic fire detection systems. Specification for high temperature heat detectors 
 EN 54 part 9	Components of automatic fire detection systems. Methods of test of sensitivity to fire

Test fires of EN 54 
The test fires TF1 to TF8 are used to test the fire sensitivity of the fire detectors according to the standard series EN 54. 

The combustibles selected represent a spectrum of large and small combustion particles for both grey and black smoke. These include burning liquids, plastics and cellulosic (wood) materials, and glowing and smouldering fabrics.

For smoke detectors according to EN 54-7 and fire detectors with smoke sensor (parts 12, 20 and 30 of EN 54) the test fires TF2, TF3, TF4 and TF5 are used. The EN 54-20 defines the following test fires with reduced fuel quantity for aspirating smoke detectors with enhanced or very high sensitivity (class A or B):

 TF2A and TF2B
 TF3A and TF3B
 TF5A and TF5B

For flame detectors according to EN 54-10, the liquid fires TF5 and TF6 are used. TF5 (n-heptane) produces a yellow sooty flame and TF6 (methylated spirits) produces a clear invisible flame.

For CO fire detectors according to EN 54-26, the smoldering fires TF2 and TF3 are used.

For duct smoke detectors according to EN 54-27 the test fires TF2, TF4 and TF8 are used.

For multi-sensor fire detectors according to EN 54-29 and EN 54-31, the test fires TF1, TF2, TF3, TF4, TF5 and TF8 are used.

See also
 CE marking
 European Committee for Standardization (CEN, French: Comité Européen de Normalisation)
 Technical Committees at the CEN website: http://www.cen.eu/cen/Sectors/Sectors/Construction/Pages/Workprogramme.aspx

References

Fire detection and alarm
00054